The Pampulha Modern Ensemble (Portuguese: Conjunto Moderno da Pampulha) is an urban project in Belo Horizonte, Minas Gerais, Brazil. It was designed around an artificial lake, Lake Pampulha, in the district of Pampulha and includes a casino, a ballroom, the Golf Yacht Club (currently Iate Tênis Clube) and the Church of Saint Francis of Assisi. The buildings were designed by the architect Oscar Niemeyer, in collaboration with the landscape architect Roberto Burle Marx, Brazilian Modernist artists, and engineer Joaquim Cardozo.

In July 2016 the site was declared a UNESCO World Heritage Site because of its outstanding examples of modern architecture and its importance in the development of a Brazilian architectural identity.

References

External links 
 Explore Pampulha Modern Ensemble in the UNESCO collection on Google Arts and Culture

Minas Gerais
World Heritage Sites in Brazil
Oscar Niemeyer buildings